A Man's Way is a 1914 American silent short film directed by Sydney Ayres, starring  William Garwood, Charlotte Burton and Louise Lester.

Cast
Charlotte Burton
William Garwood
Louise Lester
Jack Richardson
Vivian Rich
Harry Van Meter

External links

1914 films
1914 drama films
Silent American drama films
American silent short films
American black-and-white films
1914 short films
Films directed by Sydney Ayres
1910s American films
1910s English-language films
American drama short films